The 1964 Brisbane Rugby League season was the 56th season of the Brisbane Rugby League premiership. Eight teams from across Brisbane competed for the premiership, which culminated in Northern Suburbs defeating Past Brothers 13-4 to claim their sixth consecutive premiership - the most consecutive first grade premierships won by any BRL club.

Ladder

Finals 

Source:

References 

1964 in rugby league
1964 in Australian rugby league
Rugby league in Brisbane